Patisserie Fighting (Chinese: 我的甜蜜革命) is a 2017 Singaporean web-drama series by Mediacorp Toggle. An eight-episode drama about baking, it stars Singaporean singer-actress Kit Chan and Taiwanese actor Chris Lee.

After more than a decade-long acting hiatus, this will be Chan's first drama after the 2002's Cash Is King.

Synopsis
See Yu Tin (Kit Chan), a biomedical researcher, quits her job of 20 years to fulfil her dream of being a pastry chef. One day, she chances upon a mystery pastry. Determined to discover the recipe, she tracks down the gifted yet reclusive pastry chef from Taiwan, Wu Wen Di or Hsiao D (Chris Lee), and asks to be his apprentice.

Cast
 Kit Chan as See Yu Tin (施语恬)
 Chris Lee as Wu Wen Di (吴文迪) / Hsiao D (小 D)

Production

References

Singapore Chinese dramas